Nagareyama-centralpark Station (流山セントラルパーク駅, Nagareyama-sentorarupāku-eki) is a passenger railway station in the city of Nagareyama, Chiba Prefecture, Japan. Its station number is TX11.

Line
Nagareyama-centralpark Station is served by the Metropolitan Intercity Railway Company's Tsukuba Express line, which operates between Akihabara Station in Tokyo and Tsukuba Station. It is located 24.3 kilometers from the terminus of the line at Akihabara.

Station structure
The station consists of two opposed elevated side platforms, with the station building located underneath.

Platforms

History
The station opened on 24 August 2005, coinciding with the opening of the Tsukuba Express Line.

Passenger statistics
In fiscal 2019, the station was used by an average of 5,259 passengers daily (boarding passengers only).

Surrounding area
Gyosei Kokusai Nagareyama Elementary School
Nagareyama City Yagiminami Elementary School
Tokatsu Hospital

See also
 List of railway stations in Japan

References

External links

 TX Nagareyama-centralpark Station 

Railway stations in Japan opened in 2005
Railway stations in Chiba Prefecture
Stations of Tsukuba Express
Nagareyama